John Campbell, sometimes spelled Campble was a 17th-century minister of the gospel.

He was charged in an Edinburgh court for attending a service of worship at the house of James Campbell (vintner) and Thomas Waddell (lorimer) during the hours of Sunday morning worship. He was imprisoned on the Bass Rock on the Firth of Forth in Haddingtonshire on 31 May 1678. This may have been the date of his sentence since one source has his imprisonment starting in June 1678. The duration of his incarceration is uncertain.

References

17th-century Ministers of the Church of Scotland
Covenanters
Scottish prisoners and detainees
Covenanting Prisoners of the Bass Rock